Wayne A. Harper (born February 27, 1956) is an American politician and a Republican member of the Utah State Senate representing District 16 since 2023. Prior to redistricting he represented District 6 starting in 2013. Harper served in the Utah House of Representatives from January 1, 1997, until December 31, 2012, in the District 43 seat.

Early life, education, and career
Harper earned his Bachelor of Arts in History and Master of Science from Brigham Young University. He is married to KaLee, and together they have eleven children. Harper is a Certified Archivist, Certified Real Estate Consultant, and Certified Real Estate Developer. He works as a Business and Economic Development Consultant, and for Taylorsville City. In his professional career, Harper has been affiliated with the Conference of Inter-Mountain Archivists, the International Economic Development Council, and the International Council of Shopping Centers.

Political career
Harper started his political career as a West Jordan City Councilman. He has also served as the President of the Streamline Sales Tax Governing Board and on the Utah State Historical Records Advisory Board, Utah State Capitol Preservation Board, and Utah Alliance for Economic Development.
Harper served in the House of Representatives from 1997–2012, and was elected to the Utah Senate in 2012. During the 2016 Legislative Session, Harper served on the following committees:
 Business, Economic Development, and Labor Appropriations Subcommittee
 Infrastructure and General Government Appropriations Subcommittee (Senate Chair)
 Senate Revenue and Taxation Committee
 Senate Transportation and Public Utilities and Technology Committee

Elections
In 2012 when Senate District 6 Republican Senator Michael G. Waddoups left the Legislature and left the seat open, Harper was selected from two candidates by the Republican convention for the November 6, 2012, General election, which he won with 28,073 votes (83%) against Democratic nominee John Rendell, who had run for Legislative seats in 2008 and 2010. Senator Harper is currently up for reelection.

Legislation

2016 sponsored bills

Notable legislation 
In 2016 Senator Harper passed Senate Bill 210, which outlines and regulates the use of recreational drones in Utah. The law also gives local police the authority to shoot down drones if they are not in compliance with the law, and if being shot down does not pose a threat to people or animals. This bill does not apply to commercial drones.

Controversial legislation 
In 2018 Harper sponsored SB136 which was signed into law. Among other provisions, SB136 includes an additional annual registration fee of up to $120 on clean air vehicles. The additional fees were opposed by air quality advocates such as the nonprofits Breathe Utah, and Utah Clean Energy which has stated the fees are misguided. Clean air advocates have voiced concerns that the additional fees will slow electric vehicle adoption and promote poorer air quality in Utah.

References

External links
 Official page at the Utah State Senate
 
 Wayne Harper at Ballotpedia
 
 Wayne A. Harper at the National Institute on Money in State Politics

Place of birth missing (living people)
1956 births
Living people
Brigham Young University alumni
Republican Party members of the Utah House of Representatives
People from Taylorsville, Utah
Republican Party Utah state senators
21st-century American politicians